Clayton Lopez (born May 6, 1970) is an American football coach. He previously worked as the defensive backs coach for the St. Louis Rams and Oakland Raiders of the National Football League (NFL).  He played defensive back at University of Nevada from 1991 to 1994.

On May 2, 2019 head coach Jim Zorn announced Lopez would be the defensive coordinator for the Seattle Dragons when the XFL began play in 2020. He served as the defensive coordinator until the league folded Midway through its first season.

References

External links
 Raiders profile
 St. Louis Rams profile

1970 births
Living people
Nevada Wolf Pack football coaches
Oakland Raiders coaches
Seattle Seahawks coaches
Detroit Lions coaches
Seattle Dragons coaches
St. Louis Rams coaches